Paseo Víctor Rojas, also known as El Fuerte or Paseo de Damas (Ladies' Promenade), in Arecibo, Puerto Rico, was built in 1881.  It was listed on the National Register of Historic Places in 1986.

It is a rectangular promenade that was built over the ruins of San Miguel Fort, in part using stone from the ruins.

The original paseo was damaged in the Hurricane of San Ciriaco in 1899.

It is unique as a place constructed for the "Isabellan", i.e. equivalent to "Victorian" pastime of promenading.  It acquired the name "Victor Rojas" for the location of a memorial to this person, a fisherman, who undertook rescues starting from near this location, to save persons from boats foundering.

See also

National Register of Historic Places listings in Arecibo, Puerto Rico

References

External links
 

National Register of Historic Places in Arecibo, Puerto Rico
Buildings and structures completed in 1881
1881 establishments in the Spanish Empire
1880s establishments in Puerto Rico
Park buildings and structures on the National Register of Historic Places
Parks in Puerto Rico
Buildings and structures on the National Register of Historic Places in Puerto Rico
Pedestrian infrastructure in North America
Waterfronts